The Good Parents is a 2008 novel  by Joan London.

The book concerns an eighteen-year-old girl, Maya de Jong, who moves to Melbourne and becomes involved in a relationship with her boss. When Maya's parents come to Melbourne to stay with her, they find that Maya has disappeared. London says of the role of parents with older children, "There's nothing much you can do, except wait and be there".

Awards and nominations

 2009 New South Wales Premier's Literary Awards, Christina Stead Prize for Fiction.

References

External links
Interview with Joan London, ABC Radio National The Book Show, 21 August 2008

2008 Australian novels
Novels set in Melbourne
Vintage Books books